The Silent Hostage is a 1960 spy thriller novel by the British writer Sarah Gainham. Before writing her most celebrated work Night Falls on the City, Gainham produced several thrillers set in Continental Europe where she had lived since 1947. The novel takes place on the Adriatic Coast of Yugoslavia not long after the Second World War.

Synopsis
Kate Dodds, the widow of a British war hero, is invited by the Titoist Yugoslav government to visit the country where her husband served alongside the partisans. Before long she is caught up in intrigue amidst early Cold War politics.

References

Bibliography
 Burton, Alan. Historical Dictionary of British Spy Fiction. Rowman & Littlefield, 2016.
 Reilly, John M. Twentieth Century Crime & Mystery Writers. Springer, 2015.
 Smith, Myron J. & White, Terry. Cloak and Dagger Fiction: An Annotated Guide to Spy Thrillers. Greenwood Press, 1995.

1960 British novels
Novels by Sarah Gainham
British thriller novels
British spy novels
Novels set in Yugoslavia
Eyre & Spottiswoode books